Belle Mont is a historic Jeffersonian-style plantation house near Tuscumbia in Colbert County, Alabama. It was added to the National Register of Historic Places on February 23, 1982, due to its architectural significance.

History
Belle Mont was built between 1828 and 1832 for Dr. Alexander W. Mitchell, a native of Virginia. Mitchell, a graduate of the University of Edinburgh, was also one of the first large-scale planters and slaveholders in the area. Mitchell sold the  plantation to another Virginia native, Isaac Winston, in 1833. It remained in the Winston family until 1941. It has been undergoing a phased restoration since that time and is currently operated as a historic house museum.

Architecture
Considered by architectural scholars to be a clear example of Thomas Jefferson's influence upon the architecture of the early United States, Belle Mont is one of only a few surviving examples of Jeffersonian architecture in the Deep South.  Built in red brick, it features a raised, two story central section with flanking one-story wings.  The side wings project toward the rear in a U-shape, forming a semi-enclosed rear courtyard.

See also
National Register of Historic Places listings in Colbert County, Alabama

References

External links

Houses on the National Register of Historic Places in Alabama
Houses completed in 1832
Palladian Revival architecture in Alabama
National Register of Historic Places in Colbert County, Alabama
Historic house museums in Alabama
Museums in Colbert County, Alabama
Houses in Colbert County, Alabama
Historic American Buildings Survey in Alabama
Jeffersonian Revival architecture